Phyllonorycter stephanandrae is a moth of the family Gracillariidae. It is known from the island of Honshū in Japan.

The wingspan is 6–7 mm.

The larvae feed on Stephanandra incisa. They mine the leaves of their host plant.

References

stephanandrae
Moths of Japan
Moths described in 1967